Craspedophorus festivus is a species of ground beetles in the family Carabidae.

References 

Panagaeinae
Beetles described in 1833